Outsider is a film produced in 1997 in Slovenia by writer and director Andrej Košak. The film was selected as the Slovenian entry for the Best Foreign Language Film at the 70th Academy Awards, but was not accepted as a nominee.

The film takes place in the 1980s in the former Yugoslavia. It covers issues such as the former Yugoslav punk rock scene and drug use in the year when Josip Broz Tito died.

The story begins in autumn 1979 when Sead Mulahasanović, whose father was a Warrant Officer (zastavnik) of Yugoslav People's Army moved to Ljubljana and started attending one of the local secondary schools. He immediately joined local punkers who formed a band. Because punk rock in Yugoslavia was not tolerated some of them quickly fell into trouble. Authorities were on high alert because Tito got seriously ill and was admitted to University Medical Centre Ljubljana. Sead spent a lot of time with his new friends because his father was devoted only to the army and wanted Sead to join the army school to become an officer or a pilot.

Sead fell in love with Metka, a girl from his class, so he also began spending his time with her. Then several things occurred: one of his friends was beaten by the police and put to prison, he was punished by his father for not being devoted enough to the ideas of socialism, Metka got pregnant and they were again forced to move, so Sead should leave his life behind and start it anew. He didn't hold out any more and committed suicide - coincidentally it happened on the day when Tito died.

Outsider was the top grossing Slovenian film (91,000) until Branko Đurić's film Kajmak in marmelada (over 100,000 viewers).

Cast 
Davor Janjić .... Sead Mulahasanović 'Sid'
Nina Ivanič .... Metka Hafner
Uros Potočnik .... Borut Kadunc 'Bomba'
Jure Ivanušič .... 'Podgana'
Zijah Sokolović .... Zastavnik Haris Mulahasanović
Miranda Caharija .... Marija Mulahasanović
Demeter Bitenc .... Direktor

Movie goofs
 There is a scene in the film, showing the band playing cover-version of the song "Goodbye Teens" by Plavi orkestar, which was originally released in 1985, although the movie shows the events taking place in 1980.

See also
 List of submissions to the 70th Academy Awards for Best Foreign Language Film
 List of Slovenian submissions for the Academy Award for Best Foreign Language Film

References

External links
 

1997 films
1997 drama films
Punk films
Slovene-language films
Slovenian drama films
Films set in Slovenia
Films set in Yugoslavia